Variety Is the Spice is an album by the Louis Hayes Group recorded in 1978 and released on the Gryphon label.

Reception 

The Allmusic review called it "Excellent, advanced straight-ahead music".

Track listing 
 "Kelly Colors" (Harold Mabern) – 6:40
 "Little Sunflower" (Freddie Hubbard, Leon Thomas) – 6:43 
 "Stardust" (Hoagy Carmichael, Mitchell Parish) – 5:11  
 "What's Going On" (Marvin Gaye, Renaldo Benson, Al Cleveland) – 6:00  
 "Invitation" (Bronisław Kaper, Paul Francis Webster – 7:06
 "Nisha" (Louis Hayes, Thomas) – 5:38  
 "My Favorite Things" (Richard Rodgers, Oscar Hammerstein II) – 4:19  
 "Dance With Me" (Peter Brown, Robert Rans) – 4:54  
 "A Hundred Million Miracles" (Rodgers, Hammerstein) – 4:40

Personnel 
Louis Hayes – drums
Frank Strozier – alto saxophone, flute
Harold Mabern – piano, electric piano
Cecil McBee – bass
Portinho – percussion
Titos Sompa – congas
Leon Thomas – vocals (tracks 2 & 6)

References 

Louis Hayes albums
1979 albums